The Durazzo Family is a noble Italian family of Albanian origin who came from the city of Durrës in Albania. The Durazzo family assisted the Republic of Genoa on the development of many cities.
Durazzo Family gave nine "Doge" to the city of Genoa. Still existing, the representatives of this family live in Genoa, the Principality of Monaco and Rome.

Members
Clelia Durazzo Grimaldi (1760-1830), botanist
Giacomo Durazzo (1717-1794), diplomat and man of theatre
Giacomo Filippo Durazzo (1719-1812), naturalist and bibliophile
:it:Girolamo Luigi Durazzo (1739-1809), politic
Stefano Durazzo (1594-1667), cardinal and Archbishop of Genoa
Giovanni Battista Durazzo (1565-1642), 104th Doge of the Republic of Genoa and King of Corsica

Palaces 
 Villa Di Negro Rosazza dello Scoglietto

Sources

Enciclopedia Italiana, article Durazzo.

Albanian noble families
Italian noble families
Republic of Genoa families